Usedom (also  or Usedom Town) is a town on Usedom Island, in the Vorpommern-Greifswald district in Mecklenburg-Vorpommern, Germany. It is the seat of the Amt  Usedom-Süd, to which 14 other communities also belong.

The whole island of Usedom was named after the town in medieval times.

Geography
The town lies in the southeastern part of the island of Usedom, in the so-called Achterland, on the northwest shore of the Oder Lagoon (Oderhaff, Stettiner Haff). The town is bordered on the west and north by the Peenestrom, the aforesaid lagoon's western outlet to the Baltic Sea.

Municipality subdivisions
The following communities belong to the town of Usedom:

History

The region has been settled since Neolithic times, and from the 8th and 9th centuries by ancient Slavs, who built a castle on the hill now known as the Schloßberg. The town's name comes from the Slavic word "uznam", meaning river mouth. Early in the twelfth century, the place was destroyed by the Danes.

In 1128, the West Pomeranian Landtag adopted Christianity, and shortly thereafter, a Premonstratensian monastery, Usedom Abbey (also Grobe or Pudagla Abbey) was established in Usedom. In the thirteenth century, the German settlement of Usedom began as part of the eastern colonization (Ostsiedlung) in progress in many places at that time. On 23 December 1298, Usedom was granted town rights under Lübeck law.

The town burnt down twice in great fires in 1475 and 1688. After the Treaty of Stettin (1630) and the subsequent Peace of Westphalia (1648) and the Treaty of Stettin (1653), Usedom, along with all of Western Pomerania, became a Dominion of Sweden (Swedish Pomerania) until 1720, when it was acquired by Prussia. From 1720 to 1945, the town was Prussian. The town had a railway connection from 1876.

In 1934, at Karnin, a railway bridge, the Karnin Lift Bridge, was built, but it was destroyed in the Second World War. After the war, the town first belonged to the state of Mecklenburg-Vorpommern until East Germany abolished the Land system in 1952, whereafter it was in the Rostock region. At German reunification in 1990, Usedom once again found itself in the state of Mecklenburg-Vorpommern.

Sightseeing
Worth seeing in Usedom are the Anklamer Tor ("Anklam Gate"), St. Mary's (Marienkirche), the Schloßberg ("residence hill") with its memorial to the conversion to Christianity implemented by Otto of Bamberg in 1128, and the ruins of the Karnin Lift Bridge. Furthermore, the town's old railway station houses the nature park centre with very interesting displays about nature in the immediate vicinity.

Transport connections
Through Usedom runs the island's main south road (Federal Highway B110), connecting the town to Pinnow on the mainland, and farther afield, Anklam. In the other direction, the B110 joins the B111, the road that runs along Usedom island's north shore, at Seebad Ahlbeck. Until 1945, the town had a railway station on the Ducherow-Swinemünde line, which now houses the island's nature park centre. Usedom today lies far from the island's only railway line, (Usedomer Bäderbahn). Usedom has a small harbour on the Usedomer See, an inlet with a narrow opening – the Kehle, or channel – into the lagoon.

Twin towns – sister cities

Usedom is twinned with:
 Henstedt-Ulzburg, Germany
 Maurepas, France
 Wolin, Poland

References

External links

 

Usedom
Populated coastal places in Germany (Baltic Sea)
Vorpommern-Greifswald
Populated places established in the 13th century
1290s establishments in the Holy Roman Empire
1298 establishments in Europe